Nicolas Meister (born 28 September 1999) is an Austrian football player who plays for Lafnitz on loan from Juniors OÖ.

Club career

He made his professional debut in the Austrian Football First League for FC Liefering on 1 November 2016 in a game against SC Austria Lustenau.

References

External links
 
 

1999 births
Footballers from Vienna
Living people
Austrian footballers
FC Liefering players
FC Juniors OÖ players
SKN St. Pölten players
2. Liga (Austria) players
Austrian Football Bundesliga players
Association football forwards